R v Hinks [2000] UKHL 53 is an English case heard by the House of Lords on appeal from the Court of Appeal of England and Wales. The case concerned the interpretation of the word "appropriates" in the Theft Act 1968. The relevant statute is as follows:

 Section 1 provides: "(1) A person is guilty of theft if he dishonestly appropriates property belonging to another with the intention of permanently depriving the other of it..."
 Section 3 provides: "(1) Any assumption by a person of the rights of an owner amounts to an appropriation..."

The case established that in the English law of theft, the acquisition of an indefeasible title to property is capable of amounting to an appropriation of property belonging to another for the purposes of the Theft Act 1968. Therefore, a person can appropriate property belonging to another where the other person makes him an indefeasible gift of property, retaining no proprietary interest or any right to resume or recover any proprietary interest in the property.

Facts 

In 1996 Miss Hinks was friendly with a 53-year-old man, John Dolphin, who was of limited intelligence. She was his main carer. During 1996 Mr Dolphin withdrew around £60,000 from his building society account, which was deposited in Miss Hinks's account. In 1997 Hinks was charged with theft.

During the trial, Mr Dolphin was described as being naïve and trusting and having no idea of the value of his assets or the ability to calculate their value. However, it was said that he would be capable of making a gift and understood the concept of ownership. Mr Dolphin was capable of making the decision to divest himself of money, but it was unlikely that he could make this decision alone. The defendant's argument was that the moneys were a gift from Mr Dolphin to Hinks, and that given that the title in the moneys had passed to her, there could be no theft.

She appealed to the Court of Appeal on the grounds, inter alia, that since she acquired a perfectly valid gift, there could not be an appropriation. The Court of Appeal rejected this ground of appeal, stating that the fact there has been made a valid gift is irrelevant to the question of whether there has been an appropriation. Indeed, it held that a gift may be evidence of an appropriation. Rose LJ gave the following reasons:

 Section 1 of the Theft Act 1968 does not require that there has been no gift, but merely that there has been an appropriation.
 Such an approach would be inconsistent with the cases of Lawrence v Metropolitan Police Commissioner [1972] A.C. 626 and R v. Gomez [1993] A.C. 442.
 The state of mind of the donor is irrelevant, as per Lord Browne-Wilkinson (with whom Lord Jauncey agreed) in R v. Gomez [1993] A.C. 442. It was said that the authorities maintain a strong distinction between the separate ingredients of dishonesty and appropriation.

The defendant appealed to the House of Lords.

Ruling 

The court ruled by a majority of 3–2 in favour of the respondent; namely, that the acquisition of an indefeasible title to property is capable of amounting to an appropriation of property belonging to another for the purposes of the Theft Act 1968.

Lord Steyn gave the sole substantive judgment for the majority (with whom Lord Slynn of Hadley and Lord Jauncey of Tullichettle agreed).

Lord Hutton and Lord Hobhouse of Woodborough gave dissenting judgments.

Lord Steyn 

Lord Steyn stated that the starting point must be the words of the Theft Act 1968, as interpreted by the House of Lords in previous decisions. He cited three House of Lords cases:

 Lawrence v Metropolitan Police Commissioner [1972] A.C. 626, which held that in a prosecution for theft it is unnecessary to prove that the taking was without the owner's consent.
 R v Morris [1984] A.C. 320, in which Lord Roskill's judgment conflicted with that of Lawrence v Metropolitan Police Commissioner. He stated that "the concept of appropriation in my view involves not an act expressly or impliedly authorised by the owner but an act by way of adverse interference with or usurpation of those rights." This disparity was resolved in the following case:
 R v Gomez [1993] A.C. 442, where the court held by a majority (Lord Lowry dissenting) that there can be an appropriation where that which is alleged to be stolen passes to the defendant with the consent of the owner, but that consent has been obtained by a false representation. The court added that such a passing of property need not involve an element of adverse interference with, or usurpation of, some right of the owner. Lord Roskill's comments in R v Morris (cited above) were disapproved.

His Lordship noted that the case law interprets section 3(1) of the Theft Act 1968 by treating "appropriation" as a neutral word comprehending "any assumption by a person of the rights of an owner". In other words, it is immaterial whether the act was done with the owner's consent or authority.

His Lordship then turned to the appellant's arguments. Counsel had argued that the effect of the decisions in R v Lawrence and R v Gomez was to reduce the actus reus of theft to a "vanishing point". Lord Steyn was unconvinced by these arguments and maintained that the House of Lords had not overlooked the consequences in its previous decisions. His Lordship was motivated by a concern that if the law is restated by adopting a narrower definition of appropriation, the outcome is likely to place beyond the reach of the criminal law dishonest persons who should be found guilty of theft.

Counsel for the defendant also highlighted the conflict between civil and criminal law that would result from a broad interpretation of the word "appropriates", along with the "grotesque and absurd" results that such a decision would allow. Lord Steyn, however, accepted that in a practical world there would always be a disharmony between the two systems and noted that in this disharmony it is not necessarily the criminal law that is defective. He therefore declined to depart from the rulings in R v Gomez and R v Lawrence.

His Lordship pointed out that the mental requirements of the law of theft offer adequate protection from the injustice that would otherwise result from a broad interpretation of the word "appropriates".

For these reasons, Lord Steyn rejected the appellant's counsel's argument that the law as expounded in R v Gomez and R v Lawrence must be qualified to say that there can be no appropriation unless the other party (the owner) retains some proprietary interest, or the right to resume or recover some proprietary interest, in the property. He also declined to accept the counsel's alternative argument that "appropriates" should be interpreted as if the word "unlawfully" preceded it.

Lord Hutton 

Lord Hutton gave one of the two dissenting judgments. The other was made by Lord Hobhouse.

His Lordship was in agreement with Lord Steyn as to whether there had been an appropriation. Although not directly relevant to the issue put before the court, he then went on to consider the element of dishonesty.

He held that it was contrary to common sense that a person who receives property as a gift could be said to be acting dishonestly, regardless of the moral reprehensibility of accepting it. He argued that this was recognized by Section 2(1)(b) of the Theft Act 1968, which states that a person’s appropriation of property belonging to another is not to be regarded as dishonest if he appropriates the property in the belief that he would have the other’s consent if the other knew of the appropriation and the circumstances of it. Consequently, said Lord Hutton, a person's appropriation of property belonging to another should not be regarded as dishonest if the other person actually gives the property to him. His Lordship drew further support for this argument from Viscount Dilhorne’s judgment in R v Lawrence, and that of Pill LJ in R v Mazo [1997] 2 Cr App R 518.

Lord Hutton considered whether a defendant should be guilty by virtue of contractual vitiating factors unknown to him at the time, which render the contract void or voidable, and which have the effect that there is no valid transfer of property to the defendant.  While his Lordship agreed that such contractual principles should be confined to their own spheres and that criminal liability should not hinge upon them, he stated that where the mental incapacity of the donor is concerned it is necessary for the jury to consider that matter. He held that the defendant could only be guilty if (1) the donor did not have the mental capacity to make a gift and (2) the donee knew of this incapacity. He was also of the view that the conclusions of the court in R v Mazo and R v. Kendrick and Hopkins [1997] 2 Cr App R 524 could be reconciled with this principle.

His Lordship held that allowing the acceptance of a valid gift in these circumstances to be dishonest would also be wrong since it would link the issue of mental incapacity to what ordinary and decent people would regard as dishonest. He thought that these two components should be separate and distinct: if the donor is found to be mentally capable then the defendant is not guilty, as there has been a valid gift; however, if the donor is found to be mentally incapable so that there is not a valid contract and transfer of property, then the defendant should only be guilty if what the defendant did was dishonest by the standards of ordinary decent people and the defendant realised this. He held that the same principle should apply even where the vitiating factor was something else: undue influence or duress, for example.

Lord Hutton therefore allowed the appeal and held that their convictions should be quashed.

Lord Hobhouse concurred.

See also
English criminal law
 List of United Kingdom House of Lords Cases
 Theft

References

External links
 Full text of judgment

H
2000 in British law
House of Lords cases
2000 in case law